Marvin Ellmann (born 21 September 1987) is a German footballer who plays as a striker for SV Hönnepel-Niedermörmter. 2017/18 he was the best goalgetter in the league.

References

External links

1987 births
Living people
German footballers
Rot-Weiß Oberhausen players
Rot-Weiss Essen players
Wuppertaler SV players
2. Bundesliga players
3. Liga players
Association football forwards
Footballers from Duisburg